The Chagos Islands national football team is a football team representing the territory of the Chagos Archipelago in the Indian Ocean. However, this area, which falls under the administration of the British Indian Ocean Territory, is uninhabited save for the presence of a US military base on the island of Diego Garcia, after the United Kingdom evicted the local population between 1967 and 1973. As a consequence, the team in fact represents the Chagossian diaspora around the world.
They are led by Sussex-based manager Jimmy Ferrar, who has previously managed at Oakwood, Crawley Down and Alfold where he won the Southern Combination Div 1 for season 2018/19.

Background

Union Chagossiene de Football years

In 2004, following the granting of Chagossians living in the UK the right to apply for a British passport, a group of islanders living near Crawley in West Sussex founded a governing body for football among their community, and the wider worldwide Chagossian diaspora, with a view to forming a national team. Amongst the activities the UCF undertook was organizing a club side, Chagos Islands F.C., which played in the Crawley and District Football League until it was disbanded in 2010. With no immediate UK domestic outlet for their players to play, the UCF attempted to promote the side in the international arena, attempting to take a team to the 2010 Viva World Cup in Gozo. However, owing to the association's financial situation, and the wholly amateur status of the players, this was not possible. Attempts to reform the club side in another local league in Sussex also failed, leading to the team training regularly, but not playing.

In December 2011, a friendly was finally arranged with the Raetia football team, another member of the N.F.-Board, who not only came to the UK, but also brought a full set of kit for the Chagossian team to use. The game was played at the ground of Oakwood F.C., for whom Chagossian straker Mervin Bhujan was a player, and who arranged use of the stadium, and led to a 6–1 victory for the Chagos Islands. This led to hopes that the team would be able to participate more fully in N.F.-Board events, but lack of finances again meant this was to prove impossible.

In May 2012, a second match was organized, this time against Sealand. This was a first "away" game for the Chagossians, played at the home of Godalming Town F.C. in Surrey, which was used by Sealand for their home games, and resulted in a second consecutive win for the Chagos Islands. However, in spite of successfully staging a pair of games, the UCF was forced to fold.

Chagos Football Association years

In February 2013, a new organization, the Chagos Football Association, was formed by Sabrina Jean and others to continue the management of the Chagos team. The first match organized under the new body was a game against Sealand, taking place in February 2014 at Godalming, and which saw the Chagossians suffer their first defeat. A third game was quickly organized, this time taking place at the home of Crawley Town F.C., in May 2014, ending in a 1–1 draw.

In February 2014, around the same time as playing their second fixture against Sealand, the CFA joined ConIFA, in an attempt to find more regular games. The team played its first official fixture against another member of ConIFA when they turned out for a game against Somaliland in London in November 2014, again ending in a 1–1 draw. In 2015, the CFA announced its intention to attempt to qualify to participate in its first tournament, the ConIFA World Football Cup, via ConIFA's recently announced qualification process, by participating in a tournament hosted by Raetia, the Benedikt Fontana Cup. Originally planned as a three-team tournament, this altered into a two-legged play-off between the hosts and the Chagossians. However, just before the tie was due to take place, the Chagossians were forced to withdraw. This did not stop the ambition of the CFA to participate, with a fundraising effort to help the team make it to the 2016 tournament in Abkhazia announced in October 2015. To this end, the team played another friendly against Panjab in December 2015, which saw the team suffer its heaviest defeat 4–1.

In January 2016, the Chagos Islands were announced as one of the 12 participants in the 2016 World Football Cup. The opportunity to participate in a first ever overseas tournament led to a drive to raise the money necessary to allow the team to make the journey to Abkhazia. The Chagos Islands were successful in raising the necessary funds and took part in the 2016 ConIFA World Football Cup, however the team failed to win a single game and suffer 2 of their biggest defeats in the group stage, 9–0 loss to Panjab and 12–0 loss to Western Armenia, the team  subsequently lost 3–2 to Somaliland and lost on penalties to Raetia after drawing 3–3 in their final game of the tournament.

Tournament record

CONIFA World Football Cup

WUFA World Series

International results

2011

2012

2014

2015

2016

2017

2018

2019

2020

2021

2022

Selected International Opponents

Managers

References

Sport in the British Indian Ocean Territory
National Football Team
Asian N.F.-Board teams
CONIFA member associations